Sunny's Halo (February 11, 1980 – June 3, 2003) was a Thoroughbred racehorse who won the 1983 Kentucky Derby. In 1986, Sunny's Halo was inducted into the Canadian Horse Racing Hall of Fame.

Background
Foaled at Oshawa, Ontario, Sunny's Halo was owned and bred by Toronto stockbroker David J. Foster. He was trained by David Cross Jr.

Racing career
The horse won 7 of 11 races at age two but stress fractures in both front shins ended his season earlier than planned. Nonetheless, his performance earned him a 1982 Sovereign Award. In an attempt to heal the ankle problem, he was one of the first horses to be treated at the equine indoor swimming pool designed and built in the early 1970s by Jesse Reynolds. His    Getaway Farm was known as the finest location for layups and Thoroughbred therapy. It was located in King Ontario Canada north of Woodbine race track.

At age three, Sunny's Halo won the Arkansas Derby with jockey Eddie Delahoussaye aboard. The duo captured the Kentucky Derby against a very strong field that included future U.S. Racing Hall of Fame inductee Slew o' Gold. It marked the first time in history that an Arkansas Derby winner won the Kentucky Derby. After the race, he developed a rash and a return of the sore ankle affected his performance. The colt finished sixth in the Preakness Stakes and 4th in the Arlington Classic. Unable to compete in the June 26, 1983 Queen's Plate, he was back on the track in good health in the fall. In October he equaled the Louisiana Downs track record for 1¼ miles in winning the Super Derby by 12 lengths. He was scheduled to compete for the final time in November's Meadowlands Cup but the recurring ankle problem ended his career.

Stud record
Syndicated for $7.5 million, Sunny's Halo was retired to stand at stud at Domino Stud in Lexington, Kentucky. He eventually went to a Texas breeding farm where he became that state's all-time leading sire by progeny earnings.

Sunny's Halo died in 2003 and was buried at the Double S Thoroughbred Farm in Bullard, Texas where he last stood at stud. However, in July 2006, his remains were exhumed and returned to Louisville, Kentucky to be re-interred at the Kentucky Derby Museum at Churchill Downs.  His leading progeny include Race the Wild Wind (Santa Maria Handicap), Irgun (Wood Memorial) and Dispersal (Woodward Handicap).

Pedigree

External links
 Sunny's Halo's pedigree and stats
 YouTube video of Sunny's Halo winning the 1983 Kentucky Derby

References

1980 racehorse births
2003 racehorse deaths
Racehorses bred in Ontario
Racehorses trained in Canada
Canadian Horse Racing Hall of Fame inductees
Kentucky Derby winners
Horse monuments
Thoroughbred family 4-m